Milford H. Beagle Jr. is a United States Army lieutenant general who serves as commanding general of the United States Army Combined Arms Center and commandant of the United States Army Command and General Staff College since October 4, 2022. He most recently served as the commanding general of the 10th Mountain Division and Fort Drum since July 12, 2021 to September 9, 2022. Beagle previously served as the 51st commanding general of the United States Army Training Center at Fort Jackson from June 22, 2018, to June 18, 2021. He has also served as deputy commanding general for support of the 10th Mountain Division from 2017 to 2018 and commander of the 193rd Infantry Brigade from 2013 to 2016.

The great-grandson of World War I veteran Walter Beagles, Beagle is the second African American to command the 10th Mountain Division since Lloyd Austin's tenure from 2003 to 2005. He is a native of Enoree, South Carolina, and is married to the former Pamela Jones of Blackville, South Carolina, with whom he has two sons. He received his commission from the ROTC program at the South Carolina State University, graduating with a Bachelor of Science degree in criminal justice, later earning a Master of Science degree in adult education from Kansas State University and a Master of Science degree in advanced military studies from the United States Army Command and General Staff College.

References

https://www.wwnytv.com/2022/05/26/general-beagle-promoted-set-leave-fort-drum-near-future/

External links

Living people
Date of birth missing (living people)
Year of birth missing (living people)
People from South Carolina
Military personnel from South Carolina
African-American United States Army personnel
South Carolina State University alumni
Kansas State University alumni
United States Army Command and General Staff College alumni
Recipients of the Defense Superior Service Medal
Recipients of the Legion of Merit
United States Army generals
21st-century African-American people
Commandants of the United States Army Command and General Staff College